Hemiolaus ceres is a butterfly in the family Lycaenidae. It is found on Madagascar. The habitat consists of forests.

References

External links
Die Gross-Schmetterlinge der Erde 13: Die Afrikanischen Tagfalter. Plate XIII 67 b

Butterflies described in 1865
Hypolycaenini
Butterflies of Africa
Taxa named by William Chapman Hewitson